Langfang Teachers College (廊坊师范学院 Lángfāng shīfàn xuéyuàn) is a university in Hebei, China, under the provincial government.

Universities and colleges in Hebei
Teachers colleges in China